Against is an Australian hardcore punk band from Brisbane, Australia. Vocalist Greg first formed the group in September 2001, with the intention of having fun with some friends and playing hardcore music with heart and a message.

After signing with Common Bond Records, Against recorded and released their second EP, entitled My Hate My Choice, to critical acclaim and has now sold over 2000 copies to date. Constant touring across Australia with bands such as Mindsnare and Champion, as well as sharing the stage with such bands as AFI, Terror, Madball, Cro-Mags, Boysetsfire and Silence The Epilogue, has helped pave their path to success and allowed them to thoroughly "road-test" their sound.

With Against's first album entitled Left For Dead, released on Melbourne-based Trial & Error Records in November 2006, the band have taken their sound to the next level. Against's second studio release, Loyalty and Betrayal, was released on 20 August 2007.

Current Lineup
 Greg Appleby — Vocals
 Ash McIntyre — Guitar
 Michael Elmes — Guitar
 Chris Hill — Bass
 Christopher Dumble — Drums

Former members
 Chris Buttery — Guitar (Pre Demo)
 Bojan Sambolec — Drums (Demo, My Hate, My Choice)
 Mike Sambolec — Bass (Demo, My Hate, My Choice)
 Nathan Scutts — Drums (Demo, My Hate, My Choice)
 Sean Cash — Bass
 Dean Allthorpe — Bass (My Hate My Choice)
 Tyrone Ross — Bass (My Hate My Choice)
 Chris Dusting — Guitar (Demo, My Hate My Choice)
 Dave Banning — Guitar (Left for Dead)
 Vinnie Steel — Guitar (My Hate My Choice, Left for Dead)
 Brett Kearney — Drums (My Hate My Choice, Left for Dead, Loyalty & Betrayal)
 Steve Blackaby — Bass (Loyalty & Betrayal)
 Andrew Barber — Guitar (Left for Dead, Loyalty & Betrayal)

Discography
 2002 — Won't Be Your Fall Demo CD
 2004 — My Hate My Choice CD
 2005 — Left For Dead CD
 2007 — Loyalty and Betrayal CD
 2013 — Bring The End - LP

See also
 Trial & Error Records

External links
 Against on Facebook

Australian hardcore punk groups